Edwin James Rees (1899 – after 1925) was a Welsh professional footballer who played as an inside right in the Football League for Charlton Athletic and Bradford City.

Career
Born in Llanelly, Rees spent his early career with Ton Pentre and Charlton Athletic. He joined Bradford City in May 1925, making 2 league appearances for the club, before being released in 1926.

Sources

References

1899 births
Year of death missing
Welsh footballers
Association football inside forwards
Ton Pentre F.C. players
Charlton Athletic F.C. players
Bradford City A.F.C. players
English Football League players
Date of birth missing